The 1955 Sydney to Hobart Yacht Race, was the eleventh annual running of the "blue water classic" Sydney to Hobart Yacht Race.

Hosted by the Cruising Yacht Club of Australia based in Sydney, New South Wales, the 1955 edition began on Sydney Harbour, at noon on Boxing Day (26 December 1955), before heading south for 630 nautical miles (1,170 km) through the Tasman Sea, past Bass Strait, into Storm Bay and up the River Derwent, to cross the finish line in Hobart, Tasmania.

The 1955 Sydney to Hobart Yacht Race comprised a fleet of 17 competitors, the same number as in the 1954 race. Line-honours were awarded to Even, which raced out of New South Wales and was owned and skippered by Frederick John Palmer.

1955 fleet
17 yachts registered to begin the 1953 Sydney to Hobart Yacht race. They are:

Results

References

See also
Sydney to Hobart Yacht Race

1955
S
1955 in Australian sport
December 1955 sports events in Australia
January 1956 sports events in Australia